That's Me is a 1976 song by the Swedish pop group ABBA.

That's Me  may also refer to:

Films
That's Me (film), 1963 short comedy film directed by Walker Stuart
That's Me, 2001 Zimbabwean film

Music
That's Me (album), 1998 album by Agnetha Fältskog (from ABBA)
That's Me (Paul Simon song), a song by Paul Simon from the 2006 album Surprise
"That's Me", a song by Colton Ford from the 2008 album Tug of War
"That's Me", 2017 song by Hedegaard
"That's Me", a song by Martina McBride from the 1992 album The Time Has Come
"That's Me", a song by Pink Lady from the 2008 album America! America! America!

See also
That's Me, Too (Sådan er Jeg Osse), 1980 Danish drama film
That's Not Me (disambiguation)
The Blues; That's Me!, 1969 album by jazz saxophonist Illinois Jacquet